Simeulue Barat is a district of the Simeulue Regency on Simeulue in the Indonesian province of Aceh.  At the 2010 Census it had a total population of 10,024 people, living in 1,875 households in 2005.

References

Districts of Aceh